Ion Chirinciuc, better known by stage name Vanotek, is a Moldovan-Romanian record producer and disc jockey. He started producing music for native artists before releasing his debut single "My Heart is Gone" in 2015. The song became successful in Romania, and also brought him a nomination for Best Romanian Act at the 2016 MTV Europe Music Awards. In November 2017, Global Records distributed his debut studio album No Sleep. Two of its singles, "Tell Me Who" and "Back to Me", reached the charts in Romania and Russia, among other countries.

Career 
Ion Chirinciuc was born in Ungheni, Moldova. He moved to Romania to study at the Octav Băncilă Art School in Iași, and later relocated to Bucharest to pursue a career in music. 17 years old at that time, Vanotek went on to produce material for notable artists such as Dan Balan, Antonia and Tom Boxer. In 2015 he released his debut single, "My Heart is Gone", featuring vocals from Yanka. The song went on to be commercially successful in Romania, and brought him a nomination for Best Romanian Act at the 2016 MTV Europe Music Awards. In the same year, Vanotek attempted to represent Romania at the Eurovision Song Contest 2016 in Stockholm, Sweden with "I'm Coming Home", featuring the Code and Georgian. He ultimately finished in second place in Romania's selection show Selecția Națională. In November 2017, Vanotek released his debut album, No Sleep, distributed by Global Records. Alongside the latter label, he is also signed by Ultra Music. The album spawned a string of singles, including "Tell Me Who" and "Back to Me" with Eneli, which attained success in countries such as Romania and Russia.

In October 2019 Vanotek released single "Take Me" in collaboration with Ukrainian singer Myata.

Personal life 
Vanotek is the father of two children.

Discography

Studio albums

Singles

Awards and nominations

References 

People from Ungheni
Romanian record producers
Living people
Year of birth missing (living people)
Global Records artists